The tally on a sailor's cap is a ribbon usually bearing the name of a ship or some other establishment to which they belong. 

Practice varies with each navy, though a conventional tally is black, with a gold or yellow inscription. The inscription may be simply a ship's name (e.g. "H.M.A.S. ARRERNTE"), the name of the navy ("MARINE NATIONALE") or a longer name such as "Red Banner Baltic Fleet". During World War II, the ship's name would often be omitted from the tall—leaving just "H.M.A.S", for example—as a precautionary measure against espionage.

Likewise, the manner a tally is fastened onto the cap varies with each navy. For example, the British tie it into a bow on the left side; the Germans and Russians tie it at the back, leaving behind a pair of streamers; while the French stitch it onto the cap like an ordinary cap band.

Occasionally, the tally's colour may vary from the usual black, such as the Ribbon of Saint George tallies used in the Soviet and Russian navies to denote Guards units.

Military uniforms